Eucalyptus serraensis, commonly known as the Grampians stringybark, is a species of small tree or mallee that is endemic to the Grampians in Victoria, Australia. It has rough, stringy, fibrous or flaky bark on the trunk and sometimes also the branches, smooth bark above, lance-shaped to egg-shaped or round adult leaves, sessile flower buds in groups of three or seven, white flowers and hemispherical or cup-shaped fruit.

Description
It has rough, stringy, fibrous or flaky bark on some or all of the trunk and sometimes also the branches, smooth pale grey to brownish bark above. Flowering occurs from April to November and the flowers are white.

Taxonomy and naming
Eucalyptus serraensis was first formally described in 1993 by Pauline Ladiges and Trevor Paul Whiffin in Australian Systematic Botany, based on plant material collected from a rocky outcrop near Sundial Turntable in Grampians National Park. The specific epithet (serraensis) refers to the Serra Range in Victoria, where the species occurs.

Distribution and habitat
Grampians stringybark grows in very rocky sites on the Serra and Wonderland Ranges in the Grampians National Park.

See also
 List of Eucalyptus species

References

Flora of Victoria (Australia)
Trees of Australia
serraensis
Myrtales of Australia
Grampians (national park)